Psalm 79 is the 79th psalm of the Book of Psalms, beginning in English in the King James Version: "O God, the heathen are come into thine inheritance". In the slightly different numbering system used in the Greek Septuagint and Latin Vulgate translations of the Bible, this psalm is Psalm 78. In Latin, it is known as "Deus venerunt gentes in hereditatem tuam". It is one of the 12 Psalms of Asaph. The New American Bible (Revised Edition) calls it "a prayer for Jerusalem".

The psalm forms a regular part of Jewish, Catholic, Lutheran, Anglican and other Protestant liturgies. It has been set to music, including works by William Byrd in Latin, Heinrich Schütz in German, and Artemy Vedel in Ukrainian.

Text

Hebrew Bible version
Following is the Hebrew text of Psalm 79:

King James Version
To the chief Musician, A Psalm for the sons of Korah.
 {A Psalm of Asaph.} O God, the heathen are come into thine inheritance; thy holy temple have they defiled; they have laid Jerusalem on heaps.
 The dead bodies of thy servants have they given to be meat unto the fowls of the heaven, the flesh of thy saints unto the beasts of the earth.
 Their blood have they shed like water round about Jerusalem; and there was none to bury them.
 We are become a reproach to our neighbours, a scorn and derision to them that are round about us.
 How long, LORD? wilt thou be angry for ever? shall thy jealousy burn like fire?
 Pour out thy wrath upon the heathen that have not known thee, and upon the kingdoms that have not called upon thy name.
 For they have devoured Jacob, and laid waste his dwelling place.
 O remember not against us former iniquities: let thy tender mercies speedily prevent us: for we are brought very low.
 Help us, O God of our salvation, for the glory of thy name: and deliver us, and purge away our sins, for thy name's sake.
 Wherefore should the heathen say, Where is their God? let him be known among the heathen in our sight by the revenging of the blood of thy servants which is shed.
 Let the sighing of the prisoner come before thee; according to the greatness of thy power preserve thou those that are appointed to die;
 And render unto our neighbours sevenfold into their bosom their reproach, wherewith they have reproached thee, O Lord.
 So we thy people and sheep of thy pasture will give thee thanks for ever: we will shew forth thy praise to all generations.

Context
The psalm has been described as a communal lament complaining that the nations have defiled the Temple in Jerusalem and murdered the holy people, leaving their corpses unburied (verses 1–4). The occasion is perhaps the destruction of Jerusalem by the Babylonian army in 587 BC. Others suggest a different era; Rudinger, Wilhelm de Wette, and others suggest that the reference in the psalm is to the later persecutions under Antiochus IV Epiphanes in the era of the Maccabean Revolt where Jerusalem was attacked and looted twice.

Mention in 1 Maccabees
The book 1 Maccabees directly quotes the Psalm in chapter 7, comparing the death of the Hasideans to the faithful ones slain near Jerusalem with none to bury them.  It suggests a curious possibility for the author of the Psalm: if the Greek text is read shorn of context, it seems to imply that High Priest Alcimus wrote the Psalm.  This is surprising in context, however, as 1 Maccabees considers Alcimus an evil villain who was responsible for the deaths of the Hasideans in the first place.  Was it suggesting Alcimus was conflicted and that he mourned for those who died?  Additionally, 1 Maccabees was probably written in Hebrew originally, so the Greek version that survived was a translation.  There is no scholarly consensus on what the author meant: whether this was unclear phrasing or a translation hiccup, and it merely was the narrator noting the events were "as was written [in the Psalm]"; if Alcimus was quoting  a Psalm already in existence; or if the author of 1 Maccabees truly meant that Alcimus was indeed the author of Psalm 79.  Most translations generally err on the side of assuming the narrator was who was quoting the Psalm and making the comparison.

Uses

Judaism 
 This psalm is recited on the Seventeenth of Tammuz in some traditions.
 Verse 8 is a part of the final paragraph of Tachanun.
 Verse 9 is the final verse of the regular Tachanun, and is also a part of the long Tachanun recited on Mondays and Thursdays.
 Verse 10 is part of Av Harachamim. 
 Verse 13 is part of Baruch Hashem L'Olam during Maariv. Part of Verse 13 is part of the Modim blessing of the Amidah.

Musical settings 
William Byrd set Psalm 79 in Latin, Deus, venerunt gentes, T 25, as a motet for five voices. Heinrich Schütz set the psalm in a metred version in German, "Ach Herr, es ist der Heiden Herr", SWV 176, as part of the Becker Psalter, first published in 1628. Artemy Vedel composed a choral concerto based on the psalm, Bozhe, priidosha iazytsy v dostoianie Tvoe.

References

External links 

 
 
  in Hebrew and English, Mechon-mamre
 Text of Psalm 79 according to the 1928 Psalter
 A psalm of Asaph. O God, the nations have invaded your inheritance; (text and footnotes) United States Conference of Catholic Bishops
 Psalm 79 – A Prayer from Conquered Exiles (text and detailed commentary) enduringword.com
 Psalm 79:1 (introduction and text) Bible study tools
 Psalm 79 / Help us, O God of our salvation, for the glory of your name. Church of England
 Psalm 79 Bible gateway
 Charles H. Spurgeon: Psalm 79 (commentary) spurgeon.org

079